Lithium nickel manganese cobalt oxides (abbreviated Li-NMC, LNMC, or NMC) are mixed metal oxides of lithium, nickel, manganese and cobalt. They have the general formula LiNixMnyCozO2. The most important representatives have a composition with x + y + z that is near 1, with a small amount of lithium on the transition metal site. In commercial NMC samples, the composition typically has < 5% excess lithium. Structurally materials in this group are closely related to lithium cobalt(III) oxide (LiCoO2) and have a layered structure but possess an ideal charge distribution of Mn(IV), Co(III), and Ni(II) at the 1:1:1 stoichiometry. For more nickel-rich compositions, the nickel is in a more oxidized state for charge balance. NMCs are among the most important storage materials for lithium ions in lithium ion batteries. They are used on the positive side, which acts as the cathode during discharge.

History 
Stoichiometric NMC cathodes are represented as points in the solid solutions between end members, LiCoO2, LiMnO2, and LiNiO2. They are historically derived from John B. Goodenough's 1980s work on LiCoO2, Tsutomo Ohzuku's work on Li(NiMn)O2, and related studies on NaFeO2-type materials. Related to the stoichiometric NMCs, lithium-rich NMC materials were first reported in 1998 and are structurally similar to lithium cobalt(III) oxide (LiCoO2) but stabilized with an excess of lithium, Li/NMC > 1.0, which manifests itself as a series of Li2MnO3-like nanodomains in the materials.  These cathodes were first reported by C. S. Johnson, J. T. Vaughey, M. M. Thackeray, T. E. Bofinger, and S. A. Hackney.  For both types of NMC cathodes, there is a formal internal charge transfer that oxidizes the manganese and reduces the nickel cations, rather than all the transition metal cations being trivalent. The two electron oxidation of the formally nickel (II) on charging contributes to the high capacity of these NMC cathode materials.  In 2001 Arumugam Manthiram postulated that the mechanism that creates the high capacity for layered oxide cathodes such as these results from a transition that can be understood based on the relative positions of the metal 3d band relative to the top of the oxygen 2p band. This observation helps explain the high capacity of NMC cathodes as above 4.4 V (vs Li) some of the observed capacity has been found to arise from oxidation of the oxide lattice rather than cation oxidation.

In 2001, Christopher Johnson, Michael Thackeray, Khalil Amine, and Jaekook Kim filed a patent for lithium nickel manganese cobalt oxide (NMC) lithium rich cathodes based on a Li2MnO3 derived domain structure. In 2001, Zhonghua Lu and Jeff Dahn filed a patent for the NMC class of positive electrode materials, based on the solid solution concept between end-members.

Metal ratios 
Several different levels of nickel are of commercial interest. The ratio between the three metals is indicated by three numbers. For example, LiNi 0.333Mn0.333Co 0.333O2 is abbreviated to NMC111 or NMC333, LiNi0.5Mn0.3Co0.2O2 to NMC532 (or NCM523), LiNi0.6Mn0.2Co0.2O2 to NMC622 and LiNi0.8Mn0.1Co0.1O2 to NMC811. In view of potential issues with cobalt sourcing, there is interest in increasing the level of nickel, even though this lowers thermal stability.

While either lithium carbonate or lithium hydroxide can be used to make NMC111, lithium hydroxide is required to make NMC811, as a lower synthesis temperature helps mitigate lithium/nickel site exchange, which has been connected to reduced performance.

Use of NMC electrodes 

NMC batteries are found in most electric cars. NMC batteries were installed in the BMW ActiveE in 2011/2011, and from 2013 in the BMW i8. Electric cars with NMC batteries include, as of 2020: Audi e-tron GE, BAIC EU5 R550, BMW i3, BYD Yuan EV535, Chevrolet Bolt, Hyundai Kona Electric, Jaguar I-Pace, Jiangling Motors JMC E200L, NIO ES6, Nissan Leaf S Plus, Renault ZOE, Roewe Ei5, VW e-Golf and VW ID.3. There are only a few electric car manufacturers that do not use NMC in their traction batteries. The most important exception is Tesla, as Tesla uses NCA batteries for its vehicles. In 2015, Elon Musk said that the home storage Tesla Powerwall is based on NMC in order to increase the number of charge/discharge cycles over the life of the units.

NMC is also used for mobile electronics such as mobile phones/smartphones, laptops in most pedelec batteries. For these applications, batteries with lithium cobalt oxide LCO were still used almost exclusively in 2008. Another application of NMC batteries are battery storage power stations. In Korea, for example, two such storage systems with NMC for frequency regulation were installed in 2016: one with 16 MW capacity and 6 MWh energy and one with 24 MW and 9 MWh. In 2017/2018, a battery with over 30 MW capacity and 11 MWh was installed and commissioned in Newman in the Australian state of Western Australia.

Properties of NMC electrodes 
The cell voltage of lithium ion batteries with NMC is 3.6–3.7 V.
Manthiram discovered that the capacity limitations of these layered oxide cathodes is a result of chemical instability that can be understood based on the relative positions of the metal 3d band relative to the top of the oxygen 2p band. This discovery has had significant implications for the practically accessible compositional space of lithium ion batteries, as well as their stability from a safety perspective.

References

See Also 

 Karim Zaghib

Manganese compounds
Lithium compounds
Nickel compounds
Cobalt compounds
Oxygen compounds